This list is of the Cultural Properties of Japan designated in the category of  for the Prefecture of Shiga.

National Cultural Properties
As of 1 August 2015, five Important Cultural Properties have been designated, being of national significance.

Prefectural Cultural Properties
As of 1 January 2004, five properties have been designated at a prefectural level.

See also
 Cultural Properties of Japan
 List of Historic Sites of Japan (Shiga)
 Ōmi Province
 List of National Treasures of Japan (historical materials)

References

External links
  Cultural Properties in Shiga Prefecture

Cultural Properties,historical materials
Historical materials,Shiga